The men's doubles competition of the 2021 World Table Tennis Championships was held from 24 to 29 November 2021.

Seeds
Seeding was based on the ITTF world ranking published on 16 November 2021. Ranking for doubles competitions is determined by combining a pair’s individual doubles ranking position to form a combined pair ranking.

  Liang Jingkun /  Lin Gaoyuan (semifinals)
  Yukiya Uda /  Shunsuke Togami (semifinals)
  Ádám Szudi /  Nándor Ecseki (second round)
  Álvaro Robles /  Ovidiu Ionescu (third round)
  Cedric Nuytinck /  Jakub Dyjas (third round)
  Chen Chien-an /  Chuang Chih-yuan (third round)
  An Jae-hyun /  Cho Dae-seong (third round)
  Benedikt Duda /  Dang Qiu (quarterfinals)
  Fan Zhendong /  Wang Chuqin (quarterfinals)
  Jang Woo-jin /  Lim Jong-hoon (final)
  Paul Drinkhall /  Liam Pitchford (quarterfinals)
  Maksim Grebnev /  Lev Katsman (second round)
  Sharath Kamal /  Sathiyan Gnanasekaran (second round)
  Noshad Alamian /  Nima Alamian (second round)
  Gastón Alto /  Horacio Cifuentes (second round)
  Martin Allegro /  Florent Lambiet (third round)

Draw

Finals

Top half

Section 1

Section 2

Bottom half

Section 3

Section 4

References

External links
Draw

Men's doubles